The 1883 season was the first in the history of the Philadelphia Quakers. The team was founded earlier in the year as a replacement for the Worcester franchise. It was the first year Philadelphia was represented in the National League since the original Athletics were disbanded in 1876. The American Association's Philadelphia Athletics had been founded a year earlier.

The team opened the year managed by Bob Ferguson; however, he was fired as manager after a disappointing 4–13 start and replaced by Blondie Purcell. The team finished the season 17–81, worst in the National League.

Preseason
The Phillies played their first game ever on April 2, 1883 and defeated the amateur Manayunk Ashlands in an exhibition game by the score of 11-0 at Recreation Park.

Regular season

Season standings

Record vs. opponents

Roster

Player stats

Batting

Starters by position
Note: Pos = Position; G = Games played; AB = At bats; H = Hits; Avg. = Batting average; HR = Home runs; RBI = Runs batted in

Other batters
Note: G = Games played; AB = At bats; H = Hits; Avg. = Batting average; HR = Home runs; RBI = Runs batted in

Pitching

Starting pitchers
Note: G = Games pitched; IP = Innings pitched; W = Wins; L = Losses; ERA = Earned run average; SO = Strikeouts

Relief pitchers
Note: G = Games pitched; W = Wins; L = Losses; SV = Saves; ERA = Earned run average; SO = Strikeouts

Notes

References
1883 Philadelphia Quakers season at Baseball Reference

Philadelphia Phillies seasons
Philadelphia Quakers season
Philadelphia